Institute of Management Studies may refer to one of several institutes in India:

 Institute of Management Studies, former name of IMS Unison University, Uttarakhand
 Institute of Management Studies, Banaras Hindu University, Uttar Pradesh
 Institute of Management Studies, Devi Ahilya University, Madhya Pradesh